The Neighborhood Playhouse School of the Theatre is a full-time professional conservatory for actors in New York City. First operational from 1915 to 1927, the school re-opened in 1928 and has been active ever since. It is the birthplace of the Meisner technique of acting, named for American actor and acting teacher Sanford Meisner.

History

The Neighborhood Playhouse had originally been founded as an off-Broadway theatre by philanthropists Alice Lewisohn and Irene Lewisohn in 1915, but closed in 1927. The following year, it re-opened as The Neighborhood Playhouse School of the Theatre with the addition of Rita Wallach Morgenthau. Neighborhood Playhouse joined American Academy of Dramatic Arts and Pasadena Playhouse as the only major professional training schools for the performing arts in the United States.

Sanford Meisner joined the faculty in 1935 from the Group Theatre. Meisner used his study of Russian theatre and acting innovator Konstantin Stanislavski's system to develop his own technique, an alternative to Lee Strasberg's method acting. The faculty also included Louis Horst, Agnes de Mille, and Martha Graham.

In 1939, when actor Gregory Peck enrolled, there were approximately 90 students at the school. Playwright Horton Foote met actor Robert Duvall at Neighborhood Playhouse when Duvall starred in a 1957 production of Foote's play, The Midnight Caller. Foote recommended Duvall to play the part of Boo Radley in the 1962 film, To Kill a Mockingbird.

The New York City Council honored the 90th anniversary of Neighborhood Playhouse with a proclamation.

Educational programs
The school offers a two-year certificate program, with admission to the second year dependent upon unanimous approval of the faculty. There is also a six-week summer intensive program.

The Neighborhood Playhouse also offers Playhouse Juniors, a Saturday training program for children in grades 1–12. Children attend a fixed curriculum of singing, acting, and dancing classes in a non-competitive environment.

Alumni

 R.J. Adams
 Agnes Morgan
 Nancy Addison
 Helen Arthur
 Elizabeth Ashley
 Dorothy A. Atabong
 Ashlie Atkinson
 Harold G. Baldridge
 Barbara Baxley
 Kim Basinger
 Carolina Bartczak
 Amanda Bearse
 Pamela Bellwood
 Michael Bendetti
 Ted Bessell
 Susan Blakely
 Richard Boone
 Connie Britton
 James Caan
 Matthew Carnahan
 June Carter Cash
 Carol Channing
 Leonardo Cimino
 Dabney Coleman
 Charles E. Conrad
 Stephanie Courtney
 Mackenzie Davis
 James Doohan
 Illeana Douglas
 Charles S. Dubin
 Keir Dullea
 Griffin Dunne
 Robert Duvall
 William Esper
 Timothy Farrell
 Mary Fickett
 Joe Flanigan
 Meg Foster
 Leonard Frey
 Edith González 
 Julie Garfield
 Betty Garrett
 Brian Geraghty
 Jeff Goldblum
 Jonathan Goldsmith
 Farley Granger
 Lee Grant
 Andre Gregory
 Jennifer Grey
 Tammy Grimes
 Wynn Handman
 David Hedison
 Anne Jackson
 Allison Janney
 Jasmine Cephas Jones
 Marta Kauffman
 Diane Keaton
 Grace Kelly
 Ken Kercheval
 Walter Koenig
 Peter Leeds
 Harding Lemay
 Geoffrey Lewis
 Irene Lewisohn
 Alice Lewisohn
 Christopher Lloyd
 Tina Louise
 Sky Lakota-Lynch
 Daniel Mann
 Kathleen Martin
 Dylan McDermott
 Darren McGavin
 Steve McQueen
 Christopher Meloni
 Peter Miller
 South Miller
 George H. Morris (Olympic Equestrian)
 Les Moonves
 Yoko Narahashi
 Leslie Nielsen
 Chris Noth
 Edmond O'Brien
 Susan Oliver
 Chris Paine
 Gregory Peck
 Joanna Pettet
 Suzanne Pleshette
 Amanda Plummer
 Sydney Pollack
 Antoni Porowski
 Tom Poston
 James Price
 Tony Randall
 Sally Jessy Raphael
 James Remar
 Bert Remsen
 Burt Reynolds
 Doris Roberts
 Wayne Rogers
 Jean Rosenthal
 Kelly Rowan
 Mark Rydell
 Sherie Rene Scott
 Marian Seldes
 Liza Snyder
 David Sobolov
 Scott Speedman
 Mary Steenburgen
 Tom Stewart
 Kenneth Tobey
 Paula Trueman
 Tom Tryon
 Brenda Vaccaro
 Gloria Vanderbilt
 Eli Wallach
 Jessica Walter
 Al Waxman
 Geoffrey Weglarz
 Jerry Weintraub
 Elizabeth Wilson
 Joanne Woodward
 Fei Xiang
 Otis Young

References

External links

 Official website
 Neighborhood Playhouse records, 1897-1967, 2004, held by the Billy Rose Theatre Division, New York Public Library for the Performing Arts
 Neighborhood Playhouse costume and set designs, 1916-circa 1931, held by the Billy Rose Theatre Division, New York Public Library for the Performing Arts

 
Theatres in Manhattan
Drama schools in the United States
Performing arts education in New York City
Lewisohn family
Educational institutions established in 1928
Turtle Bay, Manhattan
Arts organizations established in 1928
1928 establishments in New York City